Santa María Mixtequilla is a town and municipality in Oaxaca in south-western Mexico. The municipality covers an area of  km².  
It is part of the Tehuantepec District in the west of the Istmo Region.

As of 2010, the municipality had a total population of 3,638.

References

Municipalities of Oaxaca